Glenn Charles Adams (born October 4, 1947) is a former designated hitter and corner outfielder in Major League Baseball. He played for the San Francisco Giants, Minnesota Twins, and Toronto Blue Jays in a career spanning eight seasons.

Amateur career
Adams attended and played college baseball at Springfield College in Springfield, Massachusetts. In 1967, he played collegiate summer baseball with the Harwich Mariners of the Cape Cod Baseball League and was named a league all-star. Adams was the first-round pick in the 1968 amateur draft of the Houston Astros (fourth pick overall).

Professional career
After four seasons in the Astros minor league system, Adams reached AAA but was released in January 1972. He missed the 1972 season but signed with the San Francisco Giants after the 1972 season ended. He remained in the minor leagues for two more seasons, and ended up breaking into the major leagues with the Giants in 1975.

Adams played on the bay through the end of the 1976 season, after which he signed with the Minnesota Twins. He spent five seasons with Minnesota, hitting .338 in 1977 and .301 in 1979. After the 1981 season, he signed with the Toronto Blue Jays organization.  He opened the season with the AAA Syracuse Chiefs, before getting called up to the Blue Jays on July 30.  He played the rest of the season for Toronto, retiring at the conclusion of the year.  During his career, Adams appeared in 373 games as a designated hitter and 145 games as an outfielder.

References

External links

1947 births
American expatriate baseball players in Canada
Baseball players from Massachusetts
Living people
Major League Baseball left fielders
Springfield Pride baseball players
San Francisco Giants players
Minnesota Twins players
Toronto Blue Jays players
Syracuse Chiefs players
Savannah Senators players
Phoenix Giants players
Columbus Astros players
Oklahoma City 89ers players
Peninsula Astros players
Greensboro Patriots players
Harwich Mariners players
Minor league baseball managers
People from Northbridge, Massachusetts